Brădet may refer to several villages in Romania:

 Brădet, a village in Almașu Mare Commune, Alba County
 Brădet, a village in Brăduleț Commune, Argeș County
 Brădet, a village in Buntești Commune, Bihor County
 Brădet, a village in Întorsura Buzăului Town, Covasna County
 Brădet, a village in Mătăsari Commune, Gorj County
 Brădet, a village in Starchiojd Commune, Prahova County

See also 
 Brădetu (disambiguation)
 Brădești (disambiguation)
 Brădățel (disambiguation)
 Brădeanca (disambiguation)